Kada Umaga is a Philippine television news broadcasting and talk show broadcast by Net 25. Originally hosted by Tonipet Gaba, Emma Tiglao, Maureen Schrijvers, Wej Cudiamat, and Pia Guanio, It premiered on August 30, 2021,  replacing Pambansang Almusal on the network's morning line up. Gaba, Tiglao, Cudiamat, Guanio, and Daiana Menezes. currently serve as the hosts.

The program is streaming online on YouTube.

Hosts
 Tonipet Gaba  (formerly with GMA Network)
 Emma Tiglao 
 Wej Cudiamat 
 Pia Guanio  (formerly with GMA Network)
 Daiana Menezes 
 Earlo Bringas  (Kada Balita: Traffic Update Segment)

Former hosts
 Maureen Schrijvers

See also
List of programs broadcast by Net 25

References

2021 Philippine television series debuts
Breakfast television in the Philippines
Filipino-language television shows
Philippine television news shows